Cathedral Park may refer to:

Cathedral Park, Philadelphia, a neighborhood
Cathedral Park, Portland, Oregon, a neighborhood
Cathedral Park (Portland, Oregon), a park for which the neighborhood is named
Cathedral Provincial Park and Protected Area, British Columbia, Canada
Cathedral Park, Timișoara, a park in Timișoara, Romania
Cathedral Grove, MacMillan Provincial Park, British Columbia, Canada